Acme Commodity and Phrase Code is a codebook providing the general-purpose commercial telegraph code known as the Acme Code. It was published in 1923 by the Acme Code Company. The book provides a listing of condensed terms and codes used to shorten telegrams and save money. The book was extremely popular amongst businesses in the 1930s. This code was one of the few telegram codes permitted by the Allied powers during the Second World War.

Description
The Acme code consists of one hundred thousand five letter codes each intended to stand in for a phrase.
It was designed to be tolerant of transposition errors; the author claims that "no  transposition  of  any  two  adjoining  letters  will
make another word in the book". However, as later discovered by J. Reeds, the code did not provide this level of error correction, containing at least eleven pairs of words differing only by the transposition of two letters.
Despite these errors, this code is a precursor to more modern error correction codes.

References

1923 non-fiction books
Telegraphy